Metalurh Stadium is a football-only stadium in Kamianske, Ukraine. It is currently used for football matches, and is the home of Stal Kamianske. The stadium's official maximum capacity is 2,900.

History 
The stadium was built 1933 and was called "Metalurh". However at times the stadium was called different names such as "Playground Palace of Culture" and "Stal Stadium".

Reconstruction 
In 2003 the stadium was reconstructed. Heating was installed so that the pitch would not freeze. Also were installed new plastic seats, an irrigation system and an electronic scoreboard.

References

1933 establishments in Ukraine
Football venues in Dnipropetrovsk Oblast
Sport in Kamianske
FC Stal Kamianske
Sports venues in Dnipropetrovsk Oblast